The Adrian Knox Stakes is an Australian Turf Club Group 3  Thoroughbred quality handicap horse race for three-year-old fillies, over a distance of 2000 metres, held annually at Randwick Racecourse in Sydney, Australia in April. Total prize money for the race is A$200,000.

History

The race is named in honour of Chief Justice of the High Court of Australia and former chairman of the Australian Jockey Club, Adrian Knox.

The event is a lead-up race to the Australian Oaks with the winner exempt from a ballot. The Australian Oaks was called the Australian Jockey Club Adrian Knox (Oaks) Stakes from 1922 to 1956.

Name

1948–1986 - Princess Handicap
1987 onwards - Adrian Knox Stakes

Distance
1948–1959 -  7 furlongs (~1400 m)
1960–1972 -  1 mile (~1600 m)
1973 onwards - 2000 metres

Grade
1948–1979 - Principal race
1980–1985 - Listed race
1986 onwards - Group 3

Winners

 2022 - Honeycreeper
 2021 - Duais
 2020 - Colette
 2019 - Aliferous
 2018 - Luvaluva
 2017 - Waking Moment
 2016 - Diamond Made
 2015 - Candelara
 2014 - Arabian Gold
 2013 - Royal Descent
 2012 - Full Of Spirit
 2011 - Crafty Irna
 2010 - Speedy Natalie
 2009 - Miss Darcey
 2008 - Raise
 2007 - Rena's Lady
 2006 - Operetta Lass
 2005 - Don't Tell Clang
 2004 - Wild Iris
 2003 - Crianca
 2002 - Republic Lass
 2001 - Lady Mulan
 2000 - Dottoressa
 1999 - Starry Way
 1998 - Star Alight
 1997 - Sybeel
 1996 - Eureka Jewel
 1995 - Circles Of Gold
 1994 - Seto Flowerian
 1993 - Lady Agnes
 1992 - Alma Mater
 1991 - Lee's Bid
 1990 - Dual Treasures
 1989 - Chaleyer
 1988 - Lady Liberty
 1987 - Adraanette
 1986 - Just Now
 1985 - Our Sophia
 1984 - String Of Pearls
 1983 - Starzaan
 1982 - Queen's Road
 1981 - Market
 1980 - Starshine Girl
 1979 - Love's Delight
 1978 - Nobbidge
 1977 - Of Two Cities
 1976 - Calera
 1975 - La Grisette
 1974 - Leilani
 1973 - Cowper Queen
 1972 - Better Gleam
 1971 - Sparkling Red
 1970 - Affectionate
 1969 - With Respect
 1968 - Lowland
 1967 - Sialia
 1966 - Bareme's Image
 1965 - Light Fingers
 1964 - Jane Hero
 1963 - Fun For All
 1962 - Fastest
 1961 - Winnipeg
 1960 - Waitful
 1959 - Morning Gleam
 1958 - Duchess Delville
 1957 - New Amber
 1956 - Franlyle
 1955 - Sabah
 1954 - Edelweiss
 1953 - Tamuncha
 1952 - Defame
 1951 - Lady Rosetta
 1950 - Lady Kristine
 1949 - Persist
 1948 - Respond

Notes:
  Date of race rescheduled due to postponement of the Easter Saturday meeting because of the heavy track conditions. The meeting was moved to Easter Monday, 6 April 2015.

See also
 Australian Oaks
 List of Australian Group races
 Group races

External links 
Adrian Knox Stakes (ATC)

References

Horse races in Australia